Angurabad (also Romanized as Āngūrābād) is a village in Kahir Rural District, in the Central District of Konarak County, Sistan and Baluchestan Province, Iran. At the 2006 census, its population was 612, in 139 families.

References 

Populated places in Konarak County